Community Cooker Foundation is an initiative by Planning Systems Services Ltd. in Nairobi, Kenya, established in 2010, with the goal of using the Community Cooker, a simple stove designed to turn rubbish into safe, clean and cheap energy, to transform Nairobi's largest slum, Kibera.

Awards and recognition

The Community Cooker Foundation has spread the idea of Community Cooker and has received multiple international awards and recognitions:

1) Sustainia
Copenhagen, Demark April 15, 2013

Shortlisted for the 2013 edition of Sustainia 100

	
2) The FT ArcelorMittal Boldness in Business Awards
London March 20, 2013

Shortlisted for the FT ArcelorMittal Boldness in Business Awards in the Corporate Responsibility/Environment category.

	
3) The Icon Awards 2012
December 6, 2012

The Community Cooker is awarded; The Most Socially Responsible Design of the Year Award

	
4) FT/Citi Ingenuity Awards Urban Ideas in Action
New York December 5, 2012
The Community Cooker was awarded;

Energy - Urban Ingenuity Ideas in Action winner, with the Metropolitan Government of Tokyo as runner up
The Overall Global Leader Ahead of GSK, College Possible (A university in USA) and JC Decaux – Vėlib with the Paris Bureau of Transport & City of Huston as runners up.

	
5) World Design Impact Prize
Finland February 2, 2012

The Community Cooker was awarded the Inaugural World Design Impact Prize.

6) British Expertise Awards
London U.K. November 2011

Open to all British registered consultants worldwide, the Community Cooker won the Environmental Impact Award.

7) Smithsonian Cooper-Hewitt Museum of Socially Responsible Design
New York City, January 2011

The Community Cooker was showcased at the United Nations Headquarters from October 15, 2011, until January 9, 2012, as part of the Smithsonian's Design with the Other 90%: CITIES exhibition. It then went on tour for in the United States of America for two years.

References 

Organisations based in Nairobi